Matti Kalevi Pietikäinen is a computer scientist. He is currently Professor (emer.) in the Center for Machine Vision and Signal Analysis, University of Oulu, Finland. His research interests are in texture-based computer vision, face analysis, affective computing, biometrics, and vision-based perceptual interfaces. He was Director of the Center for Machine Vision Research, and Scientific Director of Infotech Oulu.

Biography 

Pietikäinen received the Doctor of Science in Technology degree from University of Oulu, Finland, in 1982. From 1980 to 1981 and from 1984 to 1985 he was with the Computer Vision Laboratory at the University of Maryland, working with a pioneer of the computer image analysis, Professor Azriel Rosenfeld. After the first visit, he established computer vision research at University of Oulu. For the 25th Anniversary book of his group in Oulu, see the list of selected publications.

He has authored over 350 refereed scientific publications, which have been frequently cited. He has made pioneering contributions to local binary patterns (LBP) methodology, texture-based image and video analysis, and facial image analysis.

He has been Associate Editor of IEEE Transactions on Pattern Analysis and Machine Intelligence (TPAMI), Pattern Recognition, IEEE Transactions on Forensics and Security, Image and Vision Computing, and IEEE Transactions on Biometrics, Behavior and Identity Science. He has also been Guest Editor for several special issues, including IEEE TPAMI and International Journal of Computer Vision.

In 2011, he was named an IEEE Fellow for his contributions to texture and facial image analysis for machine vision. Already in 1994, he received the IAPR Fellow nomination for contributions to machine vision and its applications in industry and service to the IAPR In 2018, he received the IAPR's King-Sun Fu Prize for fundamental contributions to texture analysis and facial image analysis. He was named a Highly Cited Researcher by Clarivate Analytics in 2018.Since February 2023 he will be listed by Webometrics among the Highly Cited Researchers whose h-index is at least 100.

Selected publications

References

External links 
 Center for Machine Vision and Signal Analysis, University of Oulu
 Local Binary Pattern (LBP) methodology in Scholarpedia

Fellow Members of the IEEE
Computer vision researchers
Finnish computer scientists
Academic staff of the University of Oulu
Living people
Year of birth missing (living people)